Neeruti may refer to several places in Estonia:

Neeruti, Lääne-Viru County, village in Kadrina Parish, Lääne-Viru County
Neeruti, Valga County, village in Palupera Parish, Valga County